Zbigniew Nieradka is a Polish glider pilot (currently the leader in the glider pilot's world ranking maintained by the FAI Gliding Commission), current World Champion in 18m Class (which title he successfully defended at 2012 World Championships).

Major titles 

Zbigniew Nieradka had also won Polish National Gliding Championships titles in 2012, 2011, 2007, 2006.

References

Glider pilots
Living people
Polish sportsmen
Place of birth missing (living people)
Year of birth missing (living people)